Bull Moose Township is a township in Cass County, Minnesota, United States. The population was 107 as of the 2000 census. This township was named after the Bull Moose Party.

Geography

Unincorporated communities
 Oshawa

Major highway
  Minnesota State Highway 87

Lakes
 Abel Lake
 Bergkeller Lake (east quarter)
 Cedar Lake
 Cut Lake
 Deer Lake
 Goose Lake (east three-quarters)
 Scribner Lake

Adjacent townships
 Deerfield Township (north)
 Powers Township (northeast)
 Pine River Township (east)
 Walden Township (southeast)
 Bungo Township (south)
 Ansel Township (southwest)
 McKinley Township (west)
 Badoura Township, Hubbard County (northwest)

Demographics
As of the census of 2000, there were 107 people, 38 households, and 31 families residing in the township. The population density was 3.1 people per square mile (1.2/km2). There were 54 housing units at an average density of 1.6/sq mi (0.6/km2). The racial makeup of the township was 100.00% White.

There were 38 households, out of which 39.5% had children under the age of 18 living with them, 73.7% were married couples living together, 2.6% had a female householder with no husband present, and 15.8% were non-families. 13.2% of all households were made up of individuals, and 5.3% had someone living alone who was 65 years of age or older. The average household size was 2.82 and the average family size was 3.00.

In the township the population was spread out, with 30.8% under the age of 18, 10.3% from 18 to 24, 24.3% from 25 to 44, 23.4% from 45 to 64, and 11.2% who were 65 years of age or older. The median age was 34 years. For every 100 females, there were 105.8 males. For every 100 females age 18 and over, there were 111.4 males.

The median income for a household in the township was $31,563, and the median income for a family was $41,250. Males had a median income of $16,250 versus $13,250 for females. The per capita income for the township was $12,596. There were 7.7% of families and 9.8% of the population living below the poverty line, including no under eighteens and 23.1% of those over 64.

References
 United States National Atlas
 United States Census Bureau 2007 TIGER/Line Shapefiles
 United States Board on Geographic Names (GNIS)

Townships in Cass County, Minnesota
Brainerd, Minnesota micropolitan area
Townships in Minnesota